The Forlì branch campus is located in Forlì, Italy and is one of the five separate multicampuses  of the University of Bologna.

History
The Legislative decree n° 662/1996 detected a key problem of the so-called "mega-universities" in the difficulties to access and successfully attend university curricula met by students. The need to split universities with more than 40.000 enrolled students was thus seen as urging to guarantee the right to education of potential students. While some large universities gave life to minor independent campuses (such as the University of Eastern Piedmont or the University of Rome Three) the University of Bologna opted for a Multicampus structure by activating decentralized campuses in the Romagna area.

The Forlì Branch of the University of Bologna commenced operating on the 1 October 2001. Before that date Forlì was the seat of the second Faculty of Political Science of the University of Bologna, entitled to the memory of Roberto Ruffilli, and of the School of Modern Languages for Interpreters and Translators (SSLMIT). After 2001 academic offerings were widened but kept their highly internationalized and professionalized character: the Faculties of Engineering and Economics were added to the existing faculties.

At the Forlì Branch there is the Department of Interdisciplinary Studies in Translation, Languages, and Cultures (SITLeC), the only department of the Branch, and the Linguistic Centre of Romagna Teaching Campuses (CLIRO).

Further, in 2006 e-Learning Lab laboratiores were activated. They are part of the wider e-Learning Development Center of the University of Bologna (CELAB).

References

External links
 A working day at the Forlì Branch of the University of Bologna in a video shot by Forlì TV

Forlì
University of Bologna
Universities and colleges in Emilia-Romagna